Star Wars: Episode I - The Gungan Frontier is a 1999 video game by Lucas Learning.

Plot and gameplay 
In a game similar to SimLife, the player aims to create a new ecology for Gungan colonisers by using the sacred creature known as the Kresch to build a new home on the moon given to the player by Boss Nass.

Critical reception 
Superkids wrote that the game would both challenge and delight aspiring ecologists and population biologists. Robn Kester of Inside Mac Gamers praised the game's unique style, while acknowledging its flaws. Allgame's Brad Cook thought the graphics were substandard.

Awards and nominations 

|-
| December, 1999
| Star Wars Episode I: The Gungan Frontier
| Family Life: Best of the Year
| 
|-
| December, 1999
|  Star Wars Episode I: The Gungan Frontier
| Choosing Children's Software Magazine: Best Picks for the Holidays Award
| 
|-
| September, 1999
| Star Wars Episode I: The Gungan Frontier
| Parent's Guide to Children's Media: Outstanding Achievement in Computer Programs
| 
|-
| September, 1999
| Star Wars Episode I: The Gungan Frontier
| The National Association for Gifted Children: Parenting for High Potential1999 Holiday Educational Toy List
| 
|-
| September, 1999
| Star Wars Episode I: The Gungan Frontier
| NewMedia INVISION '99: Gold in Education, Youth
| 
|-
| August, 1999
| Star Wars Episode I: The Gungan Frontier
| Technology & Learning Magazine award
| 
|}

References 

1999 video games
Star Wars video games
Classic Mac OS games
Video games developed in the United States
Windows games